Speed, as a name, may refer to:

Surname
 Benjamin Speed (born 1979), Australian film composer and musician
 Carol Speed (1945–2022), American author, singer, and actress
 Chris Speed (born 1967), American jazz musician
 Doris Speed (1899–1994), English actress
 E. J. Speed (born 1996), American football player
 Gary Speed (1969–2011), Welsh football player and manager
 Harold Speed (1872–1957), English artist
 Horace Speed (1852–1925), Oklahoma Territory's first US Attorney
 Horace Speed (baseball) (born 1951), American baseball player
 James Speed (1812–1887), Kentucky legislator and Attorney General of the United States
 James Breckenridge Speed (1844–1912), Louisville businessman and philanthropist
 James Davis Speed (1915–2006), American politician
 James S. Speed (1811–1860), ninth mayor of Louisville, Kentucky
 John Speed (1542–1629), English cartographer
 John Speed (Kentucky) (1772–1840), American judge and farmer
 Joshua Fry Speed (1814–1882), American businessman and intimate friend of Abraham Lincoln
 Keith Speed (1934–2018), English politician
 Kuini Speed (1949–2004), Fijian chief and politician
 Lake Speed (born 1948), American stock car driver
 Lancelot Speed (1860–1931), British book illustrator
 Lucy Speed (born 1976), English actress
 Malcolm Speed (born 1948), Australian businessman and sports administrator
 Ronski Speed (born 1975), German music producer and DJ
 Scott Speed (born 1983), American race car driver

Given name 
 Speed S. Fry (1817–1892), American lawyer and judge

Nickname
 William Speed Gardner (1895–1972), American race car driver
 Bob Geary (baseball) (1891–1980), American baseball pitcher
 Charles W. "Speed" Holman (1898–1931), American aviator, barnstormer, wing walker and parachutist
 Timothy Levitch (born 1970), American actor, author, and tour guide
 Carl Shipp Marvel (1894–1988), American chemist
 Pepe Smith (born 1947), Pinoy rock singer and drummer, member of the trio Speed, Glue & Shinki
 Art Spector (1920–1987), American basketball player
 Björn Strid (born 1978), Swedish heavy metal singer 
 Irving Speed Vogel (1918–2008), American sculptor, painter, and writer
 William Speed Weed, American television writer and producer
 Darren Watkins Jr. (born 2005), American YouTuber, streamer and internet personality known as IShowSpeed

Fictional characters
 Speed (character), member of the Young Avengers in the Marvel Universe
 Speed Racer (character), title character of Speed Racer, a manga and anime series 
 Speed Saunders, DC Comics character
 Speedy Buggy, title character of Speed Buggy, a Hanna-Barbera television series 
 Tony "Speed" Malatesta, one of the title characters of Mother, Jugs & Speed, a 1976 film
 Speed, one of the characters in The Odd Couple, a 1965 play, and its adaptations

See also
 Speed (disambiguation)

Lists of people by nickname